Marshall Wayne Boze (born May 23, 1971) is a former Major League Baseball pitcher who played for one season. He played for the Milwaukee Brewers for 25 games during the 1996 Milwaukee Brewers season.

Boze grew up on the Kenai Peninsula and attended Soldotna High School in Soldotna, Alaska where he played several sports.

References

External links

1971 births
Living people
Major League Baseball pitchers
Milwaukee Brewers players
Baseball players from Arizona
Newburgh Black Diamonds players
Southwestern Jaguars baseball players
Lehigh Valley Black Diamonds players
Arizona League Brewers players
Beloit Brewers players
El Paso Diablos players
Helena Brewers players
Las Vegas Stars (baseball) players
New Orleans Zephyrs players
Sinon Bulls players
Stockton Ports players
Saraperos de Saltillo players
American expatriate baseball players in Mexico
American expatriate baseball players in Taiwan
Baseball players from Alaska
People from Soldotna, Alaska
Peninsula Oilers players